William Oakes (born 27 February 1999) is a Scotland international rugby league footballer who plays on the  for the York City Knights in the Betfred Championship.

He played for Hull Kingston Rovers in the Super League and spent time on loan from Hull KR at the York City Knights in League 1 and in the Championship, as well as a loan at Dewsbury in the second tier.

Background
Oakes was born in Halifax, West Yorkshire, England.

Playing career

Early career
Oakes started playing rugby league for King Cross Park Junior R.L.F.C., at only just 6-years-old.

He played at King Cross Park until he was 13-years-old. He played every position possible whilst there and he won the 'Player of the Year' and 'Players' Player of the Year' Awards six-times each.

At the age of 13, Oakes decided that he wanted to step-up to the top division of the Yorkshire League and he then moved to the Eastmoor Dragons.

During his time at Eastmoor he won several individual accolades including the 'Players' Player' and 'Man of Steel' Awards. Oakes even scored 9 tries in a Yorkshire Cup quarter-final against Dewbury Moor.

He 'hit the ground running' and he was selected to play at under-16's level in his first year. He scored a myriad of tries and he showed that he was an established goal-kicker. He also finished the season as top scorer and he also won the 'Players' Player of the Year' Award.

In his second year with the Wakefield Trinity Wildcats' Scholarship Academy, he experienced the same success as he did in his first year and Oakes regularly scored hat-tricks. The Wakefield Trinity Wildcats' Scholarship Academy subsequently went the season unbeaten that year.

This success culminated in Will Oakes being selected in the England Youth Rugby League Team, he represented England in tests against France that year.

At the end of his Wakefield Trinity Wildcats' Scholarship, he was offered full-time professional contracts with no fewer than nine Super League clubs.

Senior career

Hull Kingston Rovers (2016 - 2020) 
Oakes decided that he liked the vision that Hull Kingston Rovers offered him, Oakes then decided that he would join them on a first-team contract at only just the age of 16. 

Oakes played for the City of Hull Academy in their inaugural year. He again showed that he was a lethal finisher and he finished the season as top points scorer, even though he missed half of the season due to international commitments.

He was also called up to the Hull Kingston Rovers' first-team, where he enjoyed his début on 28 March 2016, the game against the Wigan Warriors ended in a 16-30 defeat at the DW Stadium. Oakes enjoyed his début for Hull Kingston Rovers the month after his seventeenth birthday.

He was in and around the first-team several times, but this was to be his only first-grade appearance in the 2016 rugby league season.

Oakes suffered relegation from the Super League with Hull Kingston Rovers in the 2016 season, due to losing the Million Pound Game by the Salford Red Devils.

12-months later however, Oakes was part of the Hull Kingston Rovers' side that won promotion back to the Super League, at the first time of asking following relegation the season prior.

It was revealed on 2 May 2018, that Oakes had signed a deal to keep him at Hull Kingston Rovers, until at least the end of the 2021 rugby league season.

Dual Registration (2018)
In 2018, Oakes made multiple appearances for the York City Knights from his parent-club Hull Kingston Rovers as part of a dual registration agreement.

York City Knights (Loan)
It was announced on 23 May 2019, that Oakes had joined the York City Knights on a one month loan deal with fellow Hull Kingston Rovers' teammate, Taioalo Vaivai.

Dewsbury Rams
On 6 November 2020 it was announced that Oakes would join the Dewsbury Rams on a permanent 1-year deal.

York City Knights
On 21 October 2021 it was reported that he had signed for York City Knights in the RFL Championship

Representative career

England Academy (2016)
Oakes was selected as the youngest member of the England Academy squad that toured Australia in 2016, he represented them at test-level on this tour.

Scotland (2017 - present)
He made his Scotland International début during the 2017 Rugby League World Cup against Tonga on 29 October 2017, the Bravehearts lost the game 50-4.

References

External links
Hull KR profile
2017 RLWC profile
SL profile

1999 births
Living people
Dewsbury Rams players
English people of Scottish descent
English rugby league players
Hull Kingston Rovers players
Rugby league fullbacks
Rugby league players from Halifax, West Yorkshire
Rugby league wingers
Scotland national rugby league team players
York City Knights players